The Community Unity Party (abbreviated PPM) was a political party in based in Malaysia representing established in 1989. It has never contested in any general election and became a dormant party.

See also
Politics of Malaysia
List of political parties in Malaysia

References

Defunct political parties in Sarawak
Political parties established in 1989
1989 establishments in Malaysia